Jim Molyneux (born in Port Sunlight) was an English footballer who played for Stockport County and Chelsea. He was a capable goalkeeper and popular with the Stamford Bridge crowd. Though not prone to theatrical displays like some keepers he did take risks.

Club career

Jim Molyneux started playing with Stockport County. In 1910 he transferred to David Calderhead's Chelsea where he became a first team regular.
He was a member of the Chelsea side that reached the FA Cup in 1915. The Manchester Guardian singled out his performance in the match for praise and felt that he had been let down by his defence in all three goals that Chelsea conceded. Though others suggest the first goal was as a result of an error on his part. He would go on to make 239 appearances for Chelsea, keeping 77 clean sheets, before finally leaving in 1923.

Honours
Chelsea
1915 FA Cup Final: Runners Up

References

English footballers
Chelsea F.C. players
Stockport County F.C. players
Association football goalkeepers
FA Cup Final players
1895 births
1950 deaths